Shritima Shah is Miss Nepal International 2013. She was crowned Miss Nepal International 2013 on 20 March.

References

Miss Nepal winners
Living people
Nepalese female models
Nepalese beauty pageant winners
1993 births
Miss International 2013 delegates